The reorganization of the Brazilian Army in the Old Republic divided Brazil's territory into military regions and created divisions, brigades and, in the infantry, regiments to group the numerous military units dispersed throughout the country. The simple command chain then in use in the Army, with little organization above battalions and similar formations, gave way to permanent large echelons, with an organization based on divisions and regiments similar to that adopted in other countries. The biggest changes were made in 1908, 1915, and 1921. They were within the context of broader reform movements in the Brazilian Army.

The official consensus in the early 20th century was that the Army was inefficient and backwards, with a low budget, poor facilities, and uneven weaponry making teaching and maintenance difficult. The difficulties faced in the Canudos and Contestado wars contributed to this perception. Thus, successive modernizations and reorganizations took place, especially during the administrations of ministers Hermes da Fonseca (1907–1909), Caetano de Faria (1914–1918) and Pandiá Calógeras (1919–1922) in the Ministry of War. Several of the important changes took place during the presidency of Afonso Pena (1906–1909), as the country had good economic conditions after the government of Campos Sales (1898–1902).

Background

Reforms in the Brazilian Army 

In 1889 the Brazilian Army had 15,000 men, and could expand to 30,000 if necessary. 35% of the forces were based in Rio Grande do Sul, a border region, 10% in Rio de Janeiro (then capital of Brazil) and 5% in Mato Grosso, also a border region. In 1910 the number had risen to 24,877 men, and in 1921 it reached 76,821 "on paper". In reality it was below that number. Many units had not been constituted, as in the artillery, where there were only 24 of the 71 planned field artillery groups, and 5 of the 27 heavy artillery groups. Existing units had "glades" of staff shortages, which is observable in the actual availability of officers (2,551 out of 3,583 predicted) and doctors (216 out of 369 in 1920). According to data published in 1941 by the Minister of War, Eurico Gaspar Dutra, the actual effectives were 20,000 in 1920 and 50,000 in 1930.

At that time, the General Staff of the Army was created and military education and compulsory military service were reformed. Armaments were acquired and cadres such as auditors and quartermasters were constituted. Meanwhile, the new technologies evident in the First World War slowly began to enter the country. Mechanization began in 1921, with the Assault Car Company, made up of French Renault FT-17 tanks. As the Brazilian Air Force was only created in 1941, the Army and Navy operated their own planes, in addition to airships. The Army had several fighter, bombing and observation squadrons.

One of the targets of these reforms was the organization of troops, hitherto rudimentary, with battalion-level units (infantry battalions and cavalry and artillery regiments) dispersed throughout Brazil and grouped only in military districts, according to the states of the Federation where they were based.

Organization in other countries 

In the first half of the 20th century most Western armies organized their forces into infantry and cavalry regiments and divisions. The infantry battalion was a basic tactical unit and had 800 to 1,000 men. Some light infantry battalions (caçadores) were independent and commanded by lieutenant colonels. The rest, in the "continental" system, were commanded by majors and grouped into infantry regiments of three to 4 battalions, which had 3–4,000 men and was commanded by a colonel. Cavalry regiments were equivalent to infantry battalions, with 500 to 800 men. Artillery regiments had two to three "groups", "battalions" or "brigades", each with two to four batteries of four to six guns.

Two infantry regiments formed a brigade, with 4–6,000 men, and each division had two or three brigades. The organization of two brigades with two regiments each is called quaternary or quadrangular. The division also had a cavalry regiment or squadron and artillery, engineering and logistical support units, thus being the basic "large unit" with operating autonomy, unlike the brigade, which had considerable size but single-armed units, without the support needed to be autonomous. Divisions in World War I had 12 to 16 infantry battalions and from 15,000 men, as in the French and Austro-Hungarian armies at the beginning of the war, to more than 27,000, as in the American Army at its end. The cavalry division was one-third to one-half the strength of the infantry division (4,500 men in the French and Russian armies to 9,269 in the British), as its regiments were also smaller.

In the interwar period the command chain was shortened by the abolition of the brigade rank, with three regiments (ternary organization) under the division. With three battalions each, the division shrunk to nine infantry battalions.

Infantry regiments 
The Kingdom of Brazil had infantry regiments, but since the regency period the country had only a large number of "exiguous battalions", whose number reached 40 in 1898, each with four companies. The 1908 reorganization established battalions numbered 1st to 45th, grouped into 15 regiments of three battalions each. At the same time, 12 battalions of caçadores, numbered from 46th to 57th, and 13 companies of caçadores emerged. The battalions had three companies. The 13th to 15th regiments were disbanded in 1917 and their battalions became caçadores battalions, which were now numbered 37th to 57th. In 1919, each regiment simply had 1st, 2nd and 3rd battalions, with no continuity of numbering from one regiment to another. Meanwhile, the numbering of caçadores battalions became independent, returning to a Brazilian tradition.

The law distinguished between "line" battalions, within regiments, and caçadores battalions, but since the Paraguayan War the form of combat was the same. In 1921 the nominal strength of a battalion of caçadores was 516 soldiers, against 386 in an infantry battalion within a regiment. The regiment, in turn, numbered 1,363.

The condition of the 8th Infantry Regiment in the period 1928–30 illustrates the practical application of the regiments' system. It had only two battalions, the 2nd at headquarters and the 1st seven hours away by train, with an autonomous life outside the headquarters. The 2nd battalion had only two companies, a heavy machine gun company and a supernumerary company. The barracks at headquarters had only 490 men. The then lieutenant colonel Estevão Leitão de Carvalho, named commander, did not describe the situation of the regiment he encountered as abnormal. The ephemeral 14th and 15th Infantry Regiments were made up of two battalions.

The infantry regiments lasted until the 1970s, when they were dissolved and their battalions were directly subordinated to the newly created brigades; at that time, in the 1960s, only one of the infantry regiments was complete.

Large units 

By 1888 the Imperial Army had constituted three brigades, but brigade commands were abolished in 1891. Brigades and divisions existed only provisionally, for wartime operations. This changed in 1908 with the constitution of five "Strategic Brigades", three cavalry brigades and a mixed brigade. Both the Strategic Brigade and the cavalry brigade were ternary, with three regiments, in the case of the Strategic Brigade, infantry. The Strategic Brigade had support units and was the largest permanent echelon. The 2nd, which fought in the Contestado War, had 4,000 men.

In 1915, the Strategic Brigades gave way to the quaternary "Army Divisions", with two brigades of two infantry regiments each. The division became the most important echelon. The infantry brigades that composed it had no autonomy, consisting of infantry only. Finally, in 1921 the "Army Divisions" became only infantry divisions, with the same organization. The cavalry brigades became divisions, each quaternary, with two brigades of two regiments. The theoretical strength of an infantry division in 1921 was approximately 11,000 men.

Brigades and divisions remain in use into the 21st century, albeit in a different form. From 1938 onwards infantry brigades were eliminated, with infantry divisions becoming ternary. However, both infantry and cavalry returned to the brigade in the 1970s, when it became the main unit, with support units and operating autonomy. Cavalry divisions became brigades, and infantry divisions Army Divisions, merely grouping together a variable number of brigades.

Terriorial division 
Some provinces of the Empire had "arms commands" responsible for troops and facilities such as fortifications and arsenals. Their function as territorial inspection divisions gave way to proper troop commands in 1891, when they were abolished and the country's territory was divided into seven military districts. In 1908 the districts were abolished, creating 21 enlistment regions in the states and 13 permanent inspections under the Ministry of War. In 1915 the territory was redistributed again, this time in military regions. They were responsible for all existing units in their territory that were not explicitly under another authority. Some forces were not under regions but military circumscriptions. While the region was commanded by a divisional general, the circumscription had a brigadier general. The 6th and 7th regions, made up of only a few battalions of caçadores, were under colonels. Military regions remain in use today, with new creations and changes in territorial arrangement.

Above the regions there were inspectorates of region groups, without, however, exercising command. Two were created in 1921, the first in Recife and the second in Porto Alegre, but in 1927 their headquarters were transferred to Rio de Janeiro.

Order of battle

1889 
Not including schools, arsenals, laboratories, factories, hospitals, inspectorates, military and gunpowder deposits, audits, military colonies and prisons.

1922

Notes

References

Citations

Bibliography 

 
 
 
 
 
 
 
 
 
 
 
 
 
 
 
 
 

First Brazilian Republic
Military history of Brazil
Brazilian Army